Ioana Maria Baciu (born 4 January 1990) is a Romanian female volleyball player. She is part of the Romania women's national volleyball team.

She competed at the 2015 Women's European Volleyball Championship. On club level she plays for CSM Volei Alba Blaj since the summer of 2018. Previously she played for CSM Bucuresti and Dinamo Bucuresti.

References

External links
 

1990 births
Living people
Romanian women's volleyball players
Romanian expatriate sportspeople in Germany
Expatriate volleyball players in Germany